The national flag of Latvia was used by independent Latvia from 1918 until the country was occupied by the Soviet Union in 1940. Its use was suppressed during Soviet rule. On 27 February 1990, shortly before the country regained its independence, the Latvian government re-adopted the traditional red-white-red flag.

Though officially adopted in 1921, the Latvian flag was in use as early as the 13th century.  The red colour is sometimes described as symbolizing the readiness of the Latvians to give the blood from their hearts for freedom and their willingness to defend their sovereignty. An alternative interpretation, according to the Rhymed Chronicle of Livonia, is that a Latgalian leader was wounded in battle, and the edges of the white sheet in which he was wrapped were stained by his blood with the centre stripe of the flag being left unstained. This story is similar to the legend of the origins of the flag of Austria.

History 

The red-white-red Latvian flag is first mentioned in the medieval Rhymed Chronicle of Livonia (Livländische Reimchronik), which covers the period from 1180 to 1343, and is thus among the oldest flags in the world. The chronicle tells of a battle that took place around 1279, in which ancient Latgalian tribes from Cēsis, a city in the northern part of modern-day Latvia, went to war, bearing a red flag with a white stripe.

Legend recounts the story of the mortally wounded chief of Latgalians who was wrapped in a white sheet. The part of the sheet on which he was lying remained white, but the two edges were stained in his blood. During the next battle the bloodstained sheet was used as a flag. According to the legend this time the Latgalian warriors were successful and drove the enemy away. Ever since then Latgalian tribes have used these colours.

Based on the aforementioned historical record, the present day flag design was adapted by artist  in May 1917. The Latvian national flag, together with the national coat of arms was affirmed in this format by a special parliamentary decree of the Republic of Latvia passed on 15 June 1921.

Occupation

During the Soviet period by the Soviet Union (and briefly during occupation by Nazi Germany), the red-white-red Latvian flag was rendered unusable from 1940 to 1941 and 1944 to 1991. Any production and public display of the nationalist Latvian flag was considered anti-state crime and punishable by law. The first flag of Soviet Latvia was a red flag with the gold hammer and sickle in the top-left corner, with the Latin characters LPSR (Latvijas Padomju Sociālistiskā Republika) above them in gold in a serif font. In 1953, the final version of the flag was adopted. It depicts the Soviet flag with six 1/3 blue wavy bands representing the sea on the bottom.

Restoration
Under the influence of Mikhail Gorbachev's glasnost and perestroika initiatives, the flag of independent Latvia was restored on 15 February 1990, one and a half years before the formal recognition of Latvian independence.

Colours and proportions 
Per Latvian law, The Latvian national flag is carmine red with a white horizontal stripe. The colour on the flag is sometimes referred to as Latvian red. The red colour of the Latvian flag is a particularly dark shade, which is composed of brown and purple. The flag's colour proportions are 2:1:2 (the upper and lower red bands each being twice as wide as the central white band), and the ratio of the height of the flag to its width is fixed at 1:2.

Display of the flag 

Latvian law states that the flag and national colours can be displayed and used as an ornament if proper respect to the flag is guaranteed.  Destruction, disrespectful treatment or incorrect display of the flag is punishable by law.

The flagstaff shall be longer than the longest side of the flag, straight, painted white, and preferably made of wood. The finial at the tip of the flagstaff shall be wider than the flagstaff. Where the flag is not displayed continuously, it shall be raised at sunrise and lowered at sunset. If flown for a festival or funeral, it shall be raised before and lowered after the end of the occasion.

If the flag is flown from a flagpole in mourning, it shall be raised to half-staff.  If fixed to a flagstaff, a black ribbon whose width is  the width of the flag shall be secured to the flagstaff above the flag; the ribbon shall be of sufficient length to span the width of the flag.

Flag days 
 25 March (in mourning) — In memory of victims of communist genocide
 1 May — Constitution Day, Labour Day
 4 May — Restoration of Independence (1990)
 14 June (in mourning) — In memory of victims of communist genocide
 17 June (in mourning) — Beginning of the Soviet occupation in Latvia
 4 July (in mourning) — In memory of victims of the Holocaust (See: The Holocaust in Latvia)
 11 November — Lāčplēsis Day
 18 November — Independence Day (1918)
 First Sunday in December (in mourning) — In memory of victims of communist genocide

Official standards

Presidential Standard of Latvia 

The Standard of the President is white with the rectangular cross in the colour proportions of the national flag. In the centre of the cross covering the interruption of the colours of the national flag there is the Coat of Arms of Latvia. The proportion between the width of the national colours and that of the Standard is 1:5. The proportion between the length and width of the Standard is 3:2.

Standard of the Prime Minister of Latvia 

The Standard of the Prime Minister of Latvia is white with the symmetric cross in the colour proportions of the national flag. In top left canton of the flag the Coat of Arms is placed. The proportion between the width of the national colours and that of the Banner is 1:5. The proportion between the length and width of the Banner is 3:2.

Standard of the Speaker of the Saeima 
The Standard of the Speaker of the Saeima is white with the symmetric cross in the colour proportions of the national flag. In top right canton of the flag the Coat of Arms is placed. The proportion between the width of the national colours and that of the Banner is 1:5. The proportion between the length and width of the Banner is 3:2.

Standard of the Minister of Defence of Latvia 
The Flag of the Minister of Defence of Latvia is white with the symmetric cross in the colour proportions of the national flag. In top left canton of the flag the soldier insignia is placed. The proportion between the width of the national colours and that of the Banner is 1:5. The proportion between the length and width of the Banner is 3:2.

See also 

 List of flags of Latvia
 Coat of Arms of Latvia
 National Anthem of Latvia

References 

 
 
 The Rhyme Chronicle of Livonia (Ditleb’s von Alnpeke Livländische Reimchronik) 
 Law regarding Official standards

External links 

 The Latvian Flag fact sheet at the Latvian Institute Web site
 Flags and pendants of Latvian Naval Forces
 
 VEXILLOGRAPHIA - Флаги Латвии

1918 establishments in Latvia
National symbols of Latvia
Latvia
Latvia
Flags of Latvia
Latvia
Latvia